The 2019 Tiburon Challenger was a professional tennis tournament played on outdoor hard courts. It was the thirteenth edition of the tournament which was part of the 2019 ATP Challenger Tour. It took place in Tiburon, United States between 23 and 29 September 2019.

Singles main draw entrants

Seeds

 1 Rankings are as of September 16, 2019.

Other entrants
The following players received wildcards into the singles main draw:
  Oliver Crawford
  Brandon Holt
  Brandon Nakashima
  Emilio Nava
  Ondřej Štyler

The following players received entry into the singles main draw using protected rankings:
  Carlos Gómez-Herrera
  Raymond Sarmiento

The following players received entry from the qualifying draw:
  Michael Geerts
  Evan Zhu

Champions

Singles

 Tommy Paul def.  Thanasi Kokkinakis 7–5, 6–7(3–7), 6–4.

Doubles

 Robert Galloway /  Roberto Maytín def.  JC Aragone /  Darian King 6–2, 7–5.

References

Tiburon Challenger
2019
2019 in American tennis
September 2019 sports events in the United States
2019 in sports in California